Gennadi Vladimiroviç Kryuçkin (former Azerbaijani: Геннадий Владимирович Крючкин; born 22 October 1958) is an Azerbaijani former rower who competed for the Soviet Union in the 1980 Summer Olympics and for the Unified Team in the 1992 Summer Olympics.

In 1980 he was a crew member of the Soviet boat which won the silver medal in the coxed pairs event.

Twelve years later he finished sixth with the Unified Team boat in the 1992 coxed fours competition.

External links
 

1958 births
Living people
Azerbaijani male rowers
Russian male rowers
Soviet male rowers
Olympic rowers of the Soviet Union
Olympic rowers of the Unified Team
Rowers at the 1980 Summer Olympics
Rowers at the 1992 Summer Olympics
Olympic silver medalists for the Soviet Union
Olympic medalists in rowing
Medalists at the 1980 Summer Olympics